Severance Hospital is a teaching hospital located in Sinchon-dong, Seodaemun District, South Korea. It is one of the oldest and biggest university hospitals in South Korea. It has 2,437 beds and treats approximately 2,500,000 outpatients and 840,000 inpatients annually.

The hospital was founded as a royal hospital in 1885 by Horace N. Allen which was then restructured as Severance Hospital by Oliver R. Avison, a Canadian medical missionary with the advisory of Underwood, his role model and financial assistance from Louis H. Severance. On September 23, 1904, Avison's hospital, Severance Hospital and College, first opened its doors. Since 1957 it has been affiliated with Yonsei University College of Medicine, and is part of the Yonsei University Health System.

History 

This is the oldest Western-style hospital in the country, founded in 1885 as a royal hospital named "Gwanghyewon" by Horace N. Allen, an American doctor and medical missionary. Both Presbyterian and Methodist medical and educational missionaries from the United States were active in Korea for decades.

This was renamed Severance Hospital on 3 September 1904 after a generous American donor, Louis Severance, of Standard Oil. In the same year, the hospital added Severance Hospital Medical School and the attached School of Nursing. After 1910, when Japan took over rule of Korea, it added new requirements for hospitals and staff which the missionaries, in some cases, struggled to meet. In 1954, Florence J. Murray, an American medical missionary became superintendent of Severance. Under her leadership, surgical services expanded and the hospital merged with Chosun Christian Hospital to form Yonsei University. Murray would later lead Wonju United Christian Hospital which she would merge with Yonsei to form the Yonsei University Wonju Campus.

In 1947, after the end of World War II and Japanese rule of Korea, the medical school was upgraded to "Severance Medical College".  On 5 January 1957, the Severance Medical College was united with Yonhee University under the name of "Yonsei University".

Severance Hospital divisions 
 Severance Hospital (Sinchon)
 Gangnam Severance Hospital
 Yongin Severance Hospital
 Songdo Severance Hospital (under construction)
 Wonju Severance Christian Hospital

See also
 Louis Severance

References

External links
 Official website

Yonsei University
Teaching hospitals in South Korea
Hospitals in Seoul
Seodaemun District
Hospitals established in 1885
1885 establishments in Korea
Korean Empire
Severance family